Dam Tang-e Darrehna (also Romanized as Dam Tang-e Darrehnā; also known as Damtang-e Darrehnā) is a village in Bahmai-ye Garmsiri-ye Shomali Rural District, Bahmai-ye Garmsiri District, Bahmai County, Kohgiluyeh and Boyer-Ahmad Province, Iran. At the 2006 census, its population was 62, in seven families.

References 

Populated places in Bahmai County